The Coolpix S1 is a brand of digital camera in production by Nikon since 2005. Its image sensor is a CCD with 5.0 million pixels. It has a 2.5-inch thin-film transistor liquid crystal display device with 110,000 pixels.

See also 

 Nikon Coolpix S3
 Nikon Coolpix S10

References

External links 

S0001
Cameras introduced in 2005